HMS Ocean was a Royal Navy  light fleet aircraft carrier of 13,190 tons built in Glasgow by Alexander Stephen & Sons. Her keel was laid in November 1942, and she was commissioned on 30 June 1945.

Construction and design
The Colossus class was a class of relatively small aircraft carriers which were designed to be built quickly to meet the Royal Navy's requirements for more carriers to allow it to fight a global war. In order to allow speedy build, they were designed to mercantile rather than navy hull standards, while armour protection and long-range anti aircraft guns were not fitted. Sixteen ships were ordered by the end of 1942, but the last six were completed to a modified design as the Majestic-class.

Four Admiralty 3-drum boilers supplied steam to two sets of Parsons geared steam turbines which in turn drove two propeller shafts.

While designed to carry 24 aircraft in 1942, by the time that they became operational, the ships were accommodating 37 aircraft. Ocean was fitted with a close-in anti-aircraft armament of six quadruple and seven single 2-pounder (40 mm) pom-pom autocannon and twelve single Bofors 40 mm guns. The ship had a crew of 1300 officers and ratings.

Ocean was laid down at Alexander Stephen & Sons Glasgow shipyard on 8 November 1942 and was launched on 8 July 1944. In March 1944, a proposal was made by the Australian government to purchase a light fleet carrier, specifically Ocean. The application was rejected in early June 1945, and the carrier entered Royal Navy service. The ship was commissioned on 8 August 1945. In total, the ship required 20772 man-months to build.

Service

Following commissioning, Ocean was sent to Cammell Laird at Birkenhead for modification to operate night fighters - changes included revised radar (with American SM-1 radar replacing the British Type 277 height-finding radar) and improved direction-finding equipment. On completion of these changes in November 1945, Ocean was based at Rosyth for flying trials, with the first trials of the de Havilland Sea Hornet twin-engine fighter and the last carrier operations of the Fairey Swordfish biplane torpedo bomber. On 3 December 1945, a Sea Vampire flown by Eric "Winkle" Brown made the first  ever carrier landing of a purely jet-powered aircraft onto Ocean (although earlier that year a composite jet and piston engined Ryan FR-1 Fireball had made a carrier landing under jet power after its radial engine failed.)

In December 1945, Ocean transferred to the Mediterranean Fleet, with an air group consisting of the Supermarine Seafire-equipped 805 Naval Air Squadron and 816 Naval Air Squadron, equipped with Fairey Firefly night fighters. She disembarked her air group at Malta in June 1946 to allow her to be used as a troopship to carry troops to Singapore. In October 1946 she provided fire-fighting and medical support to the two destroyers  and  when they struck mines in the Corfu Channel incident. In May 1948, she formed part of the task force supporting the withdrawal of British forces withdrew from Palestine, providing air cover after RAF bases in Palestine had been evacuated.

Ocean twice deployed to Korea, firstly from May to October 1952 and then from May to November 1953. In August 1952 a formation of Hawker Sea Fury aircraft from the carrier engaged North Korean MiG-15 jets in air combat, shooting one down.

In August 1954 she joined the Home Fleet's training squadron but saw an active role in the Suez crisis. In the first ever large-scale helicopter borne assault, Westland Whirlwind and Bristol Sycamore helicopters from Ocean and  landed 425 men of 45 Commando and 23 tons of stores into Port Said in 90 minutes. After Suez, the ship did not see much more active service. In September 1957, the Soviet Union protested when  accompanied Ocean on a visit to Helsinki. She went into extended reserve in 1958 and was scrapped in 1962 at Faslane.

In his book on the Hungarian Revolution, Peter Fryer briefly refers to the "arrest of twelve British seamen in the aircraft carrier Ocean, following unlawful meetings" in October 1956.

References

Sources

External links

 Maritimequest HMS Ocean photo gallery

Colossus-class aircraft carriers
Ships built in Glasgow
1944 ships
Cold War aircraft carriers of the United Kingdom
Korean War aircraft carriers of the United Kingdom
Maritime incidents in 1946